Kraljevo is a city and the administrative center of the Raška District in central Serbia. It is situated on the confluence of West Morava and Ibar, in the geographical region of Šumadija, between the mountains of Kotlenik in the north, and Stolovi in the south.

In 2011 the city urban area has a population of 68,749 inhabitants, while the city administrative area has 125,488 inhabitants. With an area of 1530 km², it is the largest municipality (after Belgrade) in Serbia by area.

Name
Formerly known as Rudo Polje (Рудо Поље), Karanovac (Карановац) and Rankovićevo (Ранковићево), Kraljevo received its present name, meaning "the King's Town", from King Milan I of Serbia in honor of his own coronation and six Serbian kings that had been crowned in that area. The modern coat of arms of the city features seven crowns symbolizing the seven kings.

History and sights
The "lower" Ibar region is thought to be the first area where Serbs began to develop cultural, political and economic life. Since the end of the 11th century, the center of Grand Principality of Serbia was in the region of Raška, with state capital in the ancient fortress of Ras, near modern Novi Pazar. There are numerous monasteries in the Kraljevo area, Studenica (1188), Gradac and  Stara Pavlica. There is also a  medieval fortress known as Maglič. Monastery of Žiča (1219) was the original seat of Serbian Archbishop was used for the crowning of Serbian kings.

The village of Rudo Polje, from which Kraljevo arose, was settled during the 14th century. This area was occupied by the Turks between 1458 and 1459.

During the Turkish rule Rudo Polje became known as Karanovac. Karanovac became an important settlement during the war between Austria and Turkey in the period between 1718 and 1739. After 1718, a border between Austria and Turkey was established along right bank of river Morava.
During the first uprising of the Serbs in 1805, Karanovac was heavily damaged and most of the Muslim population left, leaving the Serbs to continue development of the city during the period following the uprising. 

After the Second Serbian uprising, Karanovac was liberated in 1819 under the rule of Prince Miloš Obrenović. In that period the Orthodox Cathedral of the Holy Trinity was built; Gospodar Vasin konak, a mansion used by wealthy guests, as well as a number of significant public buildings. Kraljevo received the first urban plan, and became an important economic city.

In 1882 King Milan Obrenović, establishing the Kingdom of Serbia, in honor of his coronation, changed Karanovac name to Kraljevo, and gave the order for restoration of rather dilapidated monastery Žiča.

In 1919, Nikolaj Velimirović, was consecrated Bishop of Žiča and spent a brief period in the city. He returned again in 1935, and stayed until 1941. He rebuilt and enlarged the monastery.

During World War II Kraljevo was occupied by the German army. In October 1941, joint forces of Chetniks and Partisans besieged and attacked German forces in Kraljevo during the Siege of Kraljevo. In retaliation the Wehrmacht carried out the Kraljevo massacre, killing 2,000 residents of the city. A memorial complex constructed in the 1970s today commemorates the site of the massacre. In November 1944, heavy battles were fought in Kraljevo and its surrounding areas culminating in the city's liberation on 29 November 1944.

During the NATO bombing of Yugoslavia in 1999 the Lađevci Airport located near Kraljevo was bombed.

One prominent feature of the area is the Coronation church which belongs to the Žiča monastery. Seven Serbian kings are said to have been crowned (the seven crowns on the city coat of arms represent this assumption) in the church. The church is Byzantine in style, and has been partially restored, with only the main tower remaining from the original building dating to 1210, when it was founded by Saint Sava, the patron saint of Serbia.

It consists of a group of old-fashioned timber and plaster buildings, a tall belfry, and a diminutive church of white marble, founded in 1190 by King Stefan Nemanja, who became a monk and was canonized as Saint Simeon. The carvings around the north, south and west doors have been partially defaced by the Turks. The inner walls are decorated with Byzantine frescoes, among which only a painting of the Last Supper, and the portraits of five saints remain from the original artwork. The dome and narthex are modern additions.

The silver shrine of Saint Simeon sits within the church, along with many gold and silver ornaments, church vessels and old manuscripts, and a set of vestments and a reliquary, believed by the monks to have been the property of Saint Sava who founded the first hospital in Studenica in the 13th century.

In various historical periods, Kraljevo was part of various administrative formats within Serbia, for example in the Kingdom of Serbs, Croats and Slovenes, as part of Northern Serbia, during the time of Kingdom of Yugoslavia as part of the Moravian Banovina, etc., and today it is officially part of Sumadija & Western Serbia Region

2010 earthquake

Kraljevo was shaken by a Mw 5.4 earthquake on 3 November 2010. Two people died and over 100 suffered light injuries. A number of buildings suffered damage, and several hundreds, chiefly older buildings, were rendered unusable. There were several weaker aftershocks including a 4.3  earthquake on November 4.

Demographics

According to the 2011 census results, a total of 125,488 inhabitants live in the city administrative area of Kraljevo.

The city of Kraljevo has 41,358 households with 3,03 members on average, while the number of homes is 53,367.

Religion structure in the city of Kraljevo is predominantly Serbian Orthodox (120,240), with minorities like Muslims (932), Atheists (487), Catholics (286), Protestants (82) and others. Most of the population speaks Serbian language (122,007).

The composition of population by sex and average age:
 Male - 61,585 (41.02 years) and
 Female - 63,903 (43.45 years).

A total of 53,137 citizens (older than 15 years) have secondary education (49.78%), while the 15,281 citizens have higher education (14.31%). Of those with higher education, 9,326 (8.73%) have university education.

Ethnic groups
The ethnic composition in the city of Kraljevo, according to the 2011 census:

Settlements
At  Kraljevo is the largest municipality of Serbia by area. Apart from the urban area, the city administrative area includes 92 settlements:

 Adrani
 Banjevac
 Bapsko Polje
 Bare
 Bogutovac
 Bojanići
 Borovo
 Bresnik
 Brezna
 Brezova
 Bukovica
 Bzovik
 Cerje
 Čibukovac
 Čukojevac
 Cvetke
 Đakovo
 Dedevci
 Dolac (Kraljevo)
 Dragosinjci
 Drakčići
 Dražiniće
 Drlupa
 Gledić
 Godačica
 Gokčanica
 Grdica
 Jarčujak
 Kamenica
 Kamenjani
 Konarevo
 Kovači
 Kovanluk
 Lađevci
 Lazac
 Leševo
 Lopatnica
 Lozno
 Maglič
 Mataruge
 Mataruška Banja
 Međurečje
 Meljanica
 Metikoš
 Milakovac
 Milavčići
 Miliće
 Miločaj
 Mlanča
 Mrsać
 Musina Reka
 Obrva
 Oplanići
 Orlja Glava
 Pečenog
 Pekčanica
 Petropolje
 Plana
 Polumir
 Popovići
 Predole
 Progorelica
 Ratina
 Ravanica
 Reka
 Ribnica
 Roćevići
 Rudnjak
 Rudno
 Samaila
 Savovo
 Sibnica
 Sirča
 Stanča
 Stubal
 Šumarice
 Tadenje
 Tavnik
 Tepeče
 Tolišnica
 Trgovište
 Ušće
 Vitanovac
 Vitkovac
 Vrba
 Vrdila
 Vrh
 Zaklopača
 Zakuta
 Zamčanje
 Zasad
 Žiča

Of those, Adrani, Centar, Čibukovac, Grdica, Higijenski Zavod, Jarčujak, Konarevo, Mataruge, Mataruška Banja, Metikoš, Ratina, Ribnica, Stara Čaršija, Vitanovac, Vrba, Zaklopača, Zelena gora and Žiča lie within the proper city limits.

Economy
The following table gives a preview of total number of registered people employed in legal entities per their core activity (as of 2019):

Tourism 
Since 1990 an annual regatta called "Joyful descend" (Veseli spust) is held on the Ibar river. It is held in the early July and in 2017 it was attended by over 300 boats and 5,000 people. Inaugural regatta in 1990 had 150 participants, but the number grew to 10,000 in 2004–06 and 20,000 in 2008.

Sport
The most popular sports in Kraljevo are basketball, volleyball and football. The volleyball club OK Ribnica is playing in top-tier Volleyball League of Serbia. The basketball club KK Sloga is playing in the second-tier Basketball League of Serbia B, while the association football club FK Kablar Sijaće Polje is playing in regional league of Serbia.

Climate

Famous residents
NBA player Vlade Divac started his career in Kraljevo, while playing for Sloga basketball club (his wife is from Kraljevo). He now donates to the club. Another NBA player, Nenad Krstić was born in Kraljevo, and played for "Mašinac" basketball club from Kraljevo. Kraljevo is the birthplace of Euroleague MVP Vasilije Micić. In Kraljevo was born Serbian international footballer Aleksandar Luković. 
Nebojša Dugalić, actor. Predrag Živković Tozovac, music cantautor, Dragan Kalafatović, young chess prodigy, Miloš Pribičević, Serbias most notourious bookmaker, Stefan Jovanović, rapper from Ribnica, Luka Voštinić, owner of Michelin rival Pro Guma and Danilo Pantović, movie director.

Twin towns – sister cities

Kraljevo is twinned with:

 Gjorče Petrov (Skopje), North Macedonia
 Grodno, Belarus
 Ivanovo, Russia
 Lod, Israel
 Maribor, Slovenia
 Niagara Falls, Canada
 Plužine, Montenegro
 Uvarovo, Russia
 Zielona Góra, Poland
 North Mitrovica, Serbia

Gallery

See also
Morava Airport
Pridvorica (Kraljevo)
Raška District
Šumadija and Western Serbia
List of places in Serbia

References

External links

 
 

 
Populated places in Raška District
Šumadija
Municipalities and cities of Šumadija and Western Serbia